The End (transcribed Al Nehaya or El Nehaya) is a 2020 Egyptian sci-fi television drama series which premiered on ON TV. The series was written by Amr Samir Atef and produced by Synergy Art Production. It was directed by Yasser Sami. It stars Youssef El Sherif, Nahed El Sebai, Sahar El Sayegh, Ahmed Wafik, Amr Abdelgelil.

Synopsis
Set in 2120, the world has been ravaged and left in ruins at that time, an engineer Zain (played by Youssef El Sherif) is trying to counteract the impact of technology on the world, however, everything changes when he meets a robot clone of himself.

Reception
Israel's Foreign Ministry condemned the series, because it predicts Israel's destruction.

References

Egyptian fantasy television series
Arabic television series
Apocalyptic television series
Television series set in the 22nd century
2020s Egyptian television series
ONTV (Egyptian TV channel) original programming